Admiral Jehu Valentine Chase (January 10, 1869 – May 24, 1937) was a career navy officer, who is most remembered for his leadership of USS ''Minnesota during World War I.

Chase was born in Pattersonville, Louisiana on 10 January 1869, and graduated from the United States Naval Academy 6 June 1890.

As commanding officer of the USS ''Minnesota when she was mined in September 1918, Chase was awarded the Navy Distinguished Service Medal in recognition of his seamanship and leadership in bringing his ship safely to port without loss of life.

Admiral Chase was Commander in Chief of the United States Fleet, from 17 September 1930 to 15 September 1931, and Chairman of the General Board from April 1932 until his retirement in February 1933. He died at Coronado, California on 24 May 1937.

Family

Chase's father was Judge Valentine Chase of St. Mary Parish. Valentine Chase was an active Republican, and was murdered during Reconstruction on 17 October 1868 by a group of unidentified men possibly associated with the Knights of the White Camelia paramilitary organization.

Chase's father-in-law, Henry Clay Taylor, was also a Rear Admiral of the U.S. Navy, and many of Chase's descendants have also served as Navy leaders. His two sons, Jay Valentine Chase and Harry Taylor Chase, each commanded ships during World War II; his great-grandson James F. Caldwell Jr. is an admiral who currently serves as director of the Naval Nuclear Propulsion Program.

Chase's grandson Griff Chase served as a police officer of the Compton Police Department in the 1960s. He later committed suicide by cop in Harbor City after injuring his back and becoming an alcoholic.

Namesake
The USS Chase was named in Chase's honor.

Decorations
Admiral Chase's decorations included: Navy Distinguished Service Medal, Navy Spanish Campaign Medal and World War I Victory Medal with Clasp.

References

Footnotes

External links

1860s births
1937 deaths
United States Naval Academy alumni
People from Patterson, Louisiana
United States Navy rear admirals (upper half)
Recipients of the Navy Distinguished Service Medal